CJLL-FM is a Canadian radio station, which broadcasts multilingual community programming at 97.9 FM in Ottawa, Ontario, with studios located on Wellington Street West in Ottawa, while its transmitter is located in downtown Ottawa. Although CJLL has a very different call sign than its Toronto sibling stations CHIN and CHIN-FM, it shares their branding as CHIN Ottawa.

History
On October 4, 2001, the CRTC approved the application by CHIN Radio/TV International, the owner of the multilingual stations CHIN and CHIN-FM in Toronto, for a broadcasting licence for a specialty FM ethnic radio station in the National Capital Region at 97.9 MHz. The station was launched in 2003 out of studios at 30 Murray Street in the ByWard Market neighborhood, which later became home to the Philippine Embassy in Ottawa.

CJLL airs programming in over 20 languages, serving up to 40 different cultural communities.  Mornings feature programming primarily in Arabic and Italian, while Spanish and Chinese (Cantonese & Mandarin) programming airs in the evenings. On evenings and weekends CHIN airs programming in Caribbean, Dutch, German, Greek, Gujarati, Haitian, Hindi, Hungarian, Korean, Persian, Portuguese, Punjabi, Romanian, Russian, Ukrainian and Urdu languages.

As of November 6, 2011, CJLL-FM was one of the radio stations that simulcasts the programs of China Radio International, a state-run radio broadcaster in the People's Republic of China. On February 10, 2016, CJLL-FM dropped the simulcast of China Radio International in the evening and overnight hours and replaced it with dance music formatted programming originating from an internet broadcaster "DJFM Toronto".

References

External links
 CHIN Radio
 

Jll
Jll
Radio stations established in 2003
China Radio International
2003 establishments in Ontario